Bernard Allou (born 19 June 1975) is an Ivorian former professional footballer who played as a winger. He most notably played for Paris Saint-Germain, Nagoya Grampus Eight and Nottingham Forest. The highlight of this time at PSG was playing as they won the 1995 Coupe de la Ligue Final against SC Bastia.

Career
Allou was born in Cocody, Ivory Coast.

In 1997, he had a trial at Newcastle United but it did not lead to a contract. In March 1999 Allou signed for Nottingham Forest and went on to make two appearances in the remainder of that season, as Forest were relegated from the Premier League. The following season, he scored two goals for Forest; one against Mansfield Town in the League Cup and one against Wolverhampton Wanderers in the league.

Career statistics

References

External links
 
 
 
 

1975 births
Living people
Footballers from Abidjan
Ivorian footballers
Association football forwards
Nagoya Grampus players
Nottingham Forest F.C. players
R.W.D. Molenbeek players
J1 League players
Premier League players
Ivorian expatriate footballers
Ivorian expatriate sportspeople in Japan
Expatriate footballers in Japan
Ivorian expatriate sportspeople in England
Expatriate footballers in England
Ivorian expatriate sportspeople in Belgium
Expatriate footballers in Belgium
Ivorian emigrants to France
Naturalized citizens of France
French footballers
Paris Saint-Germain F.C. players
Ligue 1 players
French sportspeople of Ivorian descent